TBRI may refer to:

 Taiwan Banana Research Institute, research center in Pingtung County, Taiwan
 Theodor Bilharz Research Institute, research center in Giza, Egypt

See also
 TBR1